Otter Creek is an unincorporated community in Jackson County, Iowa, United States.

History
 St. Lawrence Catholic Church, which is listed on the National Register of Historic Places, is located in Otter Creek.

References

Unincorporated communities in Jackson County, Iowa
Unincorporated communities in Iowa